Kivu was the name for a large "Region" in the Democratic Republic of Congo under the rule of Mobutu Sese Seko.

Kivu may also refer to:
 Apostolic Vicariate of Kivu, two vicariates of the White Fathers
 Diocese of Nord Kivu, an Anglican see
 Kivu 56 Power Station, a proposed installation in Rwanda
 Kivu Air, an airline based in Goma, Democratic Republic of the Congo
 Kivu conflict, began in 2004
 2013 Kivu Offensive
 Kivu District, a district of the Belgian Congo
 Kivu Lacus, a small hydrocarbon lake on the moon Titan
 Kivu Province, a province of the Belgian Congo and the Democratic Republic of the Congo
 Kivu Railway, a former narrow gauge railway (1931-1958)
 Kivu Ruhorahoza (born 1982), Rwandese film director, writer and producer
 KivuWatt Power Station, Rwanda
 Lake Kivu, one of the African Great Lakes, on the border between the Democratic Republic of the Congo and Rwanda
 2008 Lake Kivu earthquake
 North Kivu, a province of the Democratic Republic of the Congo
 2008 Nord-Kivu campaign, an armed conflict
 2014 North Kivu offensive
 South Kivu, a province of the Democratic Republic of the Congo
 2010 South Kivu fuel tank explosion
 2014 South Kivu attack
 2015 South Kivu earthquake
 Provincial Assembly of Sud-Kivu
 Vicar Apostolic of Kivu, a predecessor of the Roman Catholic Archdiocese of Bukavu

See also
 2018 Kivu Democratic Republic of the Congo Ebola virus outbreak
 Kivu clawed frog (Xenopus vestitus)
 Kivu climbing mouse (Dendromus nyasae)
 Kivu giant pouched rat (Cricetomys kivuensis)
 Kivu long-haired shrew (Crocidura lanosa)
 Kivu shrew (Crocidura kivuana)
 Kivu ground thrush (Geokichla piaggiae tanganicae)
 Ornipholidotos kivu, a butterfly found in Kivu
 Retreat at Lake Kivu, an international forum for discussing issues related to genocide at Lake Kivu, Rwanda